XHPAL-FM is a radio station in La Paz, Baja California Sur, broadcasting on the frequency of 95.9 MHz.

References

Spanish-language radio stations
Radio stations in La Paz, Baja California Sur